Amygdalohippocampal area is a cytoarchitecturally defined portion of the periamygdalar area and the cortical amygdalar nucleus at the caudal extreme of the amygdala.

References

External links 
 More information at BrainInfo

Neuroanatomy